7-Hydroxy-DHEA, or 7-hydroxydehydroepiandrosterone, may refer to:

 7α-Hydroxy-DHEA
 7β-Hydroxy-DHEA

See also
 7-Keto-DHEA
 Dehydroepiandrosterone
 7-Hydroxyepiandrosterone
 7α-Hydroxyepiandrosterone
 7β-Hydroxyepiandrosterone